Agostino Strozzi (c.1450 – after 1505) was an Augustinian abbot and author. Strozzi is recognized for his contribution to the pro-woman side of the querelle des femmes — "a debate about the nature and worth of women that unfolded in Europe from the medieval to the early modern period." Strozzi, commissioned by his cousin Margherita Cantelmo, wrote La defensione delle donne [The Defense of Women] in the 16th century.

References

External links 
 Querelle | Strozzi Querelle.ca is a website devoted to the works of authors contributing to the pro-woman side of the querelle des femmes.

15th-century births
16th-century deaths